Mederow is a German surname. Notable people with the surname include:

Heinrich Mederow (born 1945), German rower 
Paul Mederow (1887–1974), German stage and film actor

See also
Medero
Mederos

German-language surnames